Thomas Downes (12 January 1921 – 24 June 1960) was a New Zealand cricketer. He played in five first-class matches for Wellington from 1940 to 1947.

See also
 List of Wellington representative cricketers

References

External links
 

1921 births
1960 deaths
New Zealand cricketers
Wellington cricketers
Cricketers from Palmerston North